Deanna Dunagan (born May 25, 1940) is an American actress. While principally active as a stage actress, she has also worked in television and film. She is best known for her Tony Award-winning portrayal of Violet Weston in Tracy Letts' August: Osage County and for her portrayal of Nana in M. Night Shyamalan's 2015 film The Visit. She has also appeared in the recurring roles of Mother Bernadette on the Fox television series The Exorcist and Mrs. Charles on Chicago Med. She portrayed Dr. Willa Sipe in the 2018 film An Acceptable Loss by writer Joe Chappelle; and starred as Sharon in the 2021 film Stillwater alongside Matt Damon and Abigail Breslin.

Early life and education
Dunagan was born and raised in Monahans, Texas, United States, the daughter of Kathlyn (Cosper) and John Conrad Dunagan. The eldest of five children, her father was a Coca-Cola bottler and president of the Texas Historical Association; her mother was a stay-at-home parent with an active presence in the community. In an interview, Dunagan light-heartedly described her extended family, "My heritage is a long line of Southern Baptist and Methodist preachers. And aren't they all just frustrated actors?"

Dunagan earned a degree in music education from the University of Texas, Austin. She briefly dated Charles Whitman, the infamous "Texas Tower Sniper", while a college student. She married her high school sweetheart and gave birth to a son; but the marriage ended a few years later. Following her divorce, Dunagan's parents agreed to fund graduate studies at Trinity University, Texas through the Dallas Theater Center. While writing her Master's thesis, Dunagan lived in Mexico. She was engaged to a bullfighter, but they never married, and she went on to pursue her acting career in the United States.

Career
Dunagan began her acting career touring in dinner theater and later performing in regional theaters such as the Asolo Repertory Theatre in Sarasota, Florida, and the Actors Theatre of Louisville before trying her luck in New York City. She made her Broadway debut in the 1979 production of George Bernard Shaw's Man and Superman at Circle in the Square as an understudy for Ann Sachs. Sachs became ill at one point during the show's run and Dunagan filled in for her with great success. This exposure led to her to being signed with International Creative Management.

In 1981, Dunagan performed in the first national tour of Children of a Lesser God. During the tour, Dunagan visited Chicago for the first time and immediately fell in love with the city. After the end of the tour, Dunagan moved to Chicago and has lived there ever since, performing in more than 30 theaters in the Chicago area. Her work on the Chicago stage has garnered her three Joseph Jefferson Awards and three After Dark Awards.

She has worked in films including The Visit, The Naked Face, Running Scared, Men Don't Leave, and Losing Isaiah. She has also appeared in made for television movies, in the TV mini-series A Will of Their Own and Amerika, and as a guest star on the television shows Prison Break, What About Joan, Missing Persons, and The Strain. She has had recurring roles in Unforgettable and The Exorcist.

In 2007-2008, Dunagan returned to Broadway in the Steppenwolf Theatre's production of Tracy Letts' August: Osage County, having originated the role in Chicago. For her performance, Dunagan won a Tony Award, Theatre World Award, Drama Desk Award, and an Outer Critics Circle Award. She went on to portray Violet Weston in productions in London's West End in 2009 and in Sydney, Australia in 2010.

She returned to New York in 2017 to Playwrights Horizons Off-Broadway to perform in the world premiere of The Treasurer by Max Posner.

Filmography

Film

Television

Theatre

References

External links
 

20th-century American actresses
21st-century American actresses
1940 births
Actresses from Texas
American film actresses
American stage actresses
American television actresses
Drama Desk Award winners
Living people
People from Monahans, Texas
Theatre World Award winners
Tony Award winners
Trinity University (Texas) alumni
University of Texas at Austin College of Fine Arts alumni